Clifford "Cliff" Brantley (born April 12, 1968) is an American former professional baseball pitcher, who played in Major League Baseball (MLB) for the Philadelphia Phillies in  and . In 34 career big league games, he had a 4–8 record with a 4.25 earned run average (ERA). Brantley batted and threw right-handed.

Brantley was drafted by the Phillies in the 2nd round of the 1986 Major League Baseball draft.

External links

1968 births
Living people
Philadelphia Phillies players
Major League Baseball pitchers
African-American baseball players
21st-century African-American people
20th-century African-American sportspeople
Sportspeople from Staten Island
Baseball players from New York City
American expatriate baseball players in Canada
Clearwater Phillies players
Ottawa Lynx players
Reading Phillies players
Scranton/Wilkes-Barre Red Barons players
Spartanburg Phillies players
Utica Blue Sox players
Rutgers School of Law–Newark alumni
Adelphi University alumni